This is a list of aircraft used by the Finnish Air Force during World War II. Finland operated a wide variety of aircraft during World War II from several countries. The main objective of the Finnish Air Force during World War II was to maintain air superiority over Finland to prevent Soviet aircraft reinforcing the advance of Soviet ground forces into Finland. However Finnish bombers did exist and provided support to Finnish ground troops. The Finnish Air Force caused far higher losses during the war to the Soviet Air force than they received, shooting down 1,621 Soviet aircraft as opposed to 210 Finnish aircraft shot down.

Fighters 

 Polikarpov I-15
 Gloster Gauntlet
 Gloster Gladiator
 Hawker Hurricane
 Messerschmitt Bf 109
 Morane-Saulnier M.S.406
 Fokker D.XXI
 Fiat G.50 Freccia
 Curtiss P-36 Hawk
 Brewster F2A Buffalo
 Caudron C.714
 Petlyakov Pe-3
 Lavochkin-Gorbunov-Gudkov LaGG-3
 Curtiss P-40 Warhawk
 VL Myrsky

Bombers 

 Tupolev SB
 Bristol Blenheim
 Dornier Do 17
 Junkers Ju 88
 Petlyakov Pe-2
 Saab 17

Torpedo bombers 

 Blackburn Ripon
 Dornier Do 22
 Heinkel He 115
 Fokker T.VIII

Reconnaissance 

 Aero A.11
 Beriev MBR-2
 Heinkel He 59

Liaison/army cooperation 

 Fieseler Fi 156 Storch
 Westland Lysander

Transport 

 Junkers Ju 52
 Douglas DC-2
 Douglas C-47 Skytrain

Trainers 

 Polikarpov Po-2
 De Havilland Tiger Moth
 Avro Anson

Prototypes 

 VL Humu
 VL Pyörremyrsky

References

Finnish Air Force
List of
Finland